Padmanoor is a place in Kinnigoli. It is about 1.5 km from Kinnigoli bus-stand and 3 km from S.Kodi, 7 km from Mulki.

Villages in Dakshina Kannada district